Lady Frances Isabella Sophia Mary Moloney (née Lewis; 18 April 1873 – 15 August 1959) was an Irish socialite who in widowhood co-founded the Missionary Sisters of St. Columban and became a nun, taking the religious name Sister Mary Patrick. She was the daughter of Henry Owen Lewis, a Catholic landowner and MP. She married Cornelius Alfred Moloney, a colonial governor. When he retired she worked on the society page of London magazines. After his 1913 death she contemplated religious life and in 1918 John Blowick persuaded her to help the priests of the Maynooth Mission to China (later the Missionary Society of St. Columban). In 1924 with Blowick and Mary Martin she co-founded the Missionary Sisters of St. Columban, a female auxiliary to the priests. She served in China from 1926 to 1936, and thereafter headed promotional work in Ireland as superior general until 1946 and vicar general until 1952.

References

Further reading
 

1873 births
1959 deaths
20th-century Irish nuns
Roman Catholic medical missionaries
Roman Catholic missionaries in China
Spouses of British politicians
Women's page journalists
Female Roman Catholic missionaries